John Laney was a politician.

John Laney may also refer to:

John Laney (ship owner), see MV Holoholo
John Malcolm Laney, basketball coach